Pet No. 9 was a pilot boat used by the New York Sandy Hook Pilots in the 19th century. The schooner was used to pilot vessels to and from the Port of New York and New Jersey.

Construction and service

The pilot boat Pet was built in 1866 by Edward A. Costigan at Charlestown, Massachusetts, for Boston pilot Captain Abel T. Hayden, the father of Abel F. Hayden. She was 54 tons, steered by a tiller. The sister pilot-boats, Pet and Phantom, were built on a model by Dennison J. Lawlor of East Boston, Massachusetts for the New York pilots. The vessels had a reputation for swiftness under sail.

The Pet was in service for a number of years in Boston. The Boston pilot-boat Pet was purchased by Captain Joseph Henderson on August 29, 1872.

The pilot-boat Pet, was registered with the Record of American and Foreign Shipping in 1876. She was listed as a pilot schooner built in 1868. The New York Pilots were listed as owners and Joseph Henderson was listed as Master.

On November 21, 1889, the Pet, No. 9, stuck on the rocks in Newport, Rhode Island, harbor and sank and reported as having been abandoned.

Specifications
The Pet was 56 tons, 78 feet long, 21½ feet beam, 8½ feet depth of hold, draws 11 feet aft, and 6 ½ feet forward, and spreads about 1,800 yards of canvas to the three lower sails.

See also
List of Northeastern U. S. Pilot Boats

References

External links
 The Sandy Hook Pilots website

Schooners of the United States
Service vessels of the United States
1866 ships
Pilot boats
Ships built in Massachusetts